Widdebierg is a hill in the commune of Betzdorf, in eastern Luxembourg.  At 386 metres, it is one of the highest points in the canton of Grevenmacher.  It is in the centre of a nature reserve (named Widdebierg after the hill), which lies between the towns of Flaxweiler, Mensdorf, and Roodt-sur-Syre.

Betzdorf, Luxembourg
Mountains and hills of Luxembourg